Piopio may refer to:

Piopio (bird), a genus of extinct birds from New Zealand that contains two species
North Island piopio 
South Island piopio 
Piopio, New Zealand, a town in the Waitomo District in the North Island of New Zealand
a hill in the Ruahine Range in New Zealand

See also
Piopiotahi (literally one piopio or first piopio), the Māori name for Milford Sound, in Fiordland, New Zealand